Lasiacis (smallcane) is a genus of Neotropical plants in the grass family, found in the Americas from Mexico and Florida south to Argentina.

Species

Lasiacis anomala Hitchc. - Trinidad, Venezuela, Guayana, Suriname, Brazil, Colombia, Bolivia
Lasiacis divaricata (L.) Hitchc. - widespread from Mexico and Florida south to Argentina
Lasiacis grisebachii (Nash) Hitchc. - Mexico, Central America, Cuba, Puerto Rico
Lasiacis ligulata Hitchc. & Chase - South America, West Indies
Lasiacis linearis Swallen - Central America, Chiapas
Lasiacis maculata (Aubl.) Urb. - widespread from Mexico and Cuba south to Argentina
Lasiacis nigra Davidse - Mexico, Central America, northwestern South America
Lasiacis oaxacensis (Steud.) Hitchc. ex Chase - Mexico, Central America, northwestern South America, Jamaica, Hispaniola
Lasiacis procerrima (Hack.) Hitchc. ex Chase  - Mexico, Central America, northwestern South America
Lasiacis rhizophora (E.Fourn.) Hitchc. ex Chase - Mexico, Central America, northwestern South America, Greater Antilles
Lasiacis rugelii (Griseb.) Hitchc. - Mexico, Central America, Hispaniola, Cuba
Lasiacis ruscifolia (Kunth) Hitchc. ex Chase - Florida, Mexico, Central America, northwestern South America, West Indies
Lasiacis scabrior Hitchc. - Mexico, Central America, northwestern South America
Lasiacis sloanei (Griseb.) Hitchc. - Mexico, Central America, northwestern South America, West Indies
Lasiacis standleyi Hitchc. - Mexico, Central America, northwestern South America

formerly included

see Acroceras 
Lasiacis excavata - Acroceras excavatum

References

Panicoideae
Grasses of North America
Grasses of South America
Neotropical realm flora
Poaceae genera
Taxa named by A. S. Hitchcock